Midrevaux is a commune in the Vosges department in Grand Est in northeastern France.

Inhabitants are called Midrevalliens.

Geography
The village is positioned on the western edge of the département, a few kilometres to the west of Neufchâteau surrounded by forests, and bordered by the Saônelle, a tributary of the river Meuse.

See also
Communes of the Vosges department

References

Communes of Vosges (department)